Clear Creek is a stream in Shelby County in the U.S. state of Missouri. It is a tributary of the North River.

Clear Creek was so named due to the clearness of its cold spring-sourced water.

See also
List of rivers of Missouri

References

Rivers of Shelby County, Missouri
Rivers of Missouri